Shahdali may refer to:
 Shahdali Edris
 Shahdali Sib Ali